Infant and toddler safety are those actions and modifications put into place to keep babies and toddlers safe from accidental injury and death. Many accidents, injuries and deaths are preventable.

Infants begin to crawl around six to nine months of age. When they crawl, they are exposed to many dangers. Anticipating the development of the baby and toddler aids caregivers in identifying hazards before they are discovered by the child.

General recommendations  
US government agencies recommend that caregivers take the following precautions:

 Covering all unused electrical sockets with outlet plugs.
 Keeping cords out of baby's reach. Tack up cords to vertical blinds and move furniture, lamps, or electronics to hide cords.
 Securing furniture and electronics, such as bookcases and TVs, so they cannot be pulled down on top of the baby.
 Using protective padding to cover sharp edges and corners, such as from a coffee table or fireplace hearth.
 Installing safety gates at the bottom and top of stairwells or to block entry to unsafe rooms.
 Using safety latches on cabinets and doors.
 Storing all medicines, cleaning products, and other poisons out of the baby's reach.
 Removing rubber tips from doorstops or replace with one-piece doorstops.
 Looking for and removing all small objects. Objects that easily can pass through the center of a toilet paper roll might cause choking.
 Keeping houseplants out of the baby's reach. Some plants can poison or make your babies sick.
 Setting the water heater temperature to no higher than 125 degrees Fahrenheit. Water that is hotter can cause bad burns.
 Closely supervising the baby around pets. Even family pets have been known to harm familiar children.

Furniture
Toddlers typically enjoy climbing up things with steps. This includes furniture. Heavy furniture in the home is often not secured to the wall. These pieces of furniture can include bookcases and dressers that can weigh hundreds of pounds. Heavy objects like televisions that are on the furniture can also fall onto the child. If the toddler climbs up the furniture it is likely to fall onto the child. This has resulted in the deaths and injuries of children. Even if the children appears uninjured, it is possible that internal injuries have occurred with serious consequences. Often these injuries are not apparent to caregivers and as a consequence treatment can be delayed. Serious head injuries have also occurred.

Caregivers can prevent accidents related to furniture by securing the furniture to the wall. Placing heavier objects into the lowest drawers. Not placing toys on top of the furniture. Constantly monitoring the activities of the toddler. Putting drawer stops onto the drawers to prevent the toddler from opening the drawer. Mount flat-screen televisions out-of-reach and onto the wall.

Lead poisoning

No safe levels of lead in the body of a child is considered safe and can cause problems for the rest of their life. Children living in low-income families are more likely to have levels of lead in their bodies. Questions regarding the testing procedures have been called into question. Children are at greater risk as they are more likely to put objects in their mouth such as those that contain lead paint and absorb a greater proportion of the lead that they eat. Treatment is available but prevention is better.

Sleep
Bumper pads installed in cribs have been improved so that an infant cannot get caught between the pad and the bars of the crib. 

However, new guidelines advise against them since they pose suffocation hazard.

Infant and toddler food safety

Infant food safety is the identification of risky food handling practices and the prevention of illness in infants. The most simple and easiest to implement is handwashing. Food for young children, including formula and baby food can contain pathogens that can make the child very ill and even die.

Sudden infant death syndrome (SIDS)

Sudden infant death syndrome can cause the death of an infant and often no cause is found. There are some preventative measures that can be taken to reduce the risk of SIDS. These are:
 Lay the infant on his back for sleeping.
 Breastfeeding
 Keeping the mattress free of all objects and instead dress the infant warmly.
 Immunizations.
 Use a pacifier.
 Using a 'sleep sack' which prevents the infant from turning over and sleeping on her stomach.

Child abuse

It is important that caregivers recognize the potential of the abuse of their infant or toddler. An infant or toddler is potentially vulnerable to physical abuse, sexual abuse, psychological abuse and neglect and has inability to verbalize the details of the abuse. Child grooming can be a concern and occurs when a perpetrator wins the trust of caregivers for the purpose of creating an opportunity for them to sexually abuse an infant or toddler. Shaken baby syndrome can often result in serious and permanent brain damage to an infant or toddler. There are preventative measures that can be taken to reduce the risk of injuring a child this way. Those who care for infants and toddlers may benefit from stress reduction. Becoming educated on normal child development can help someone understand that crying is a normal thing for babies and toddlers, especially if they hungry or need a diaper change. Caregivers can contact another person who is willing to give them a break. Those who are drinking alcohol are more likely to injure the infant or toddler. Carefully choosing someone else to watch the infant or toddler can also reduce the risk of injury.

Car accidents

Children under the age of 3 were 43% are less likely to be injured in a car crash if their car seat was placed in the center of the car. The center position is the safest but the least used position.

Hyperthermia and hypothermia

Forgetting that an infant or toddler is in the car and leaving them where they are exposed to high temperatures can result in death.

Toddlers can wander off and fall through ice or be left out in cool or cold weather and experience hypothermia. This low body temperature is often fatal but instances of survival after a near drowning occur. Of all drowning deaths in 2013, 82,000 occurred in children less than five years old.

Drowning
Toddlers have wandered off and drowned in ponds. Toddlers can easily drown in small, shallow ornamental ponds.

Animal attacks

An infant or toddler is more likely than other family members to be injured by an animal because they cannot defend themselves and are lower to the ground. Familiar family pets with no prior history of aggression are more likely to attack the child than unfamiliar pets from other households.

Choking
Toddlers and infants who can hold objects can choke when a small object is inhaled and blocks the trachea.

Falls
High chairs can be hazardous due to the risk of falls.

References

External links
 Grooming Children for Sexual Molestation, written by Gregory M. Weber, the Assistant Attorney General for the State of Wisconsin who specializes in the prosecution of crimes committed against children.
Baby-Proofing Your Home. Guidelines from the National Safety Council

 

Human development
Pediatrics
Injuries
Infancy